A gubernatorial election was held on 2 June 2019 to elect the next governor of Saitama. 
Incumbent Governor Kiyoshi Ueda (former member of DPJ) declined to run for a fifth term. 
Motohiro Ōno, a former Upper House lawmaker and opposition candidate beat the candidate backed by the ruling LDP-Komeito coalition.

Candidates 
Kenta Aoshima, backed by LDP and Komeito.
Motohiro Ōno, backed by the opposition parties CDP, JCP, SDP, DPFP.
Satoshi Hamada for the NHK Party.
Nobuhiro Takeda.
Shizue Sakurai.

Results

References 

Gubernatorial elections in Japan
Saitama gubernatorial
Politics of Saitama Prefecture